Chima Kingsley Ugwu (born 19 July 1973 in Enugu) is a Nigerian shot putter. He also occasionally competed in discus throw.

He competed at the 1996, 2000, and 2004 Summer Olympics, and the World Championships in 1993, 1997 and 2003 without reaching the finals.

Ugwu came to the United States in 1994 and won the 1995 NJCAA outdoor shot put title while attending Central Arizona College. He was then recruited to play defensive tackle for the Arizona Wildcats football team, even though he had never played the sport before. He also won Pacific-10 Conference titles in both the shot put and discus throw.

His personal best throw is 20.26 metres, achieved in July 2000 in Lagos. This is the previous Nigerian record, and ranks him fifth in South Africans Janus Robberts, Burger Lambrechts and Karel Potgieter.

Personal life
In 2017, Ugwu was indicted for attempting to ship firearms to Nigeria.Chima was arrested in 2013 not 2017. The case went to trial in 2015 when charges were dismissed.

His son, Kingsley, plays football at Kansas State.

Competition record

References

External links
 

1973 births
Living people
Igbo sportspeople
Nigerian male shot putters
Nigerian male discus throwers
Athletes (track and field) at the 1996 Summer Olympics
Athletes (track and field) at the 2000 Summer Olympics
Olympic athletes of Nigeria
Sportspeople from Enugu
Athletes (track and field) at the 1994 Commonwealth Games
Athletes (track and field) at the 2002 Commonwealth Games
Commonwealth Games medallists in athletics
Commonwealth Games bronze medallists for Nigeria
African Games gold medalists for Nigeria
African Games medalists in athletics (track and field)
African Games silver medalists for Nigeria
Athletes (track and field) at the 1991 All-Africa Games
Athletes (track and field) at the 1995 All-Africa Games
Athletes (track and field) at the 2003 All-Africa Games
Athletes (track and field) at the 2007 All-Africa Games
African Championships in Athletics winners
Central Arizona Vaqueros men's track and field athletes
Arizona Wildcats football players
Arizona Wildcats men's track and field athletes
21st-century Nigerian people
20th-century Nigerian people
Medallists at the 1994 Commonwealth Games